Salak South is a town of Kuala Lumpur, Malaysia at the southern tip of the city.

Suburbs in Kuala Lumpur